Your Name is a 2016 Japanese animated film written and directed by Makoto Shinkai.

Your Name may also refer to:

Literature
 Your Name (novel), a Japanese light novel based on the film

Music

Albums
 Your Name (album), soundtrack album by Radwimps, 2016

Songs
 "Your Name", by Paul Baloche, 2006
 "Your Name", by Heize, 2020
 "Your Name", by Joy, 2022
 "Your Name" (song), by Little Glee Monster, 2022
 "Your Name", by Misha Smirnov, 2018
 "Your Name", by Phillips, Craig and Dean, 2007
 "Your Name", by Young JV from the 2012 album Doin' It Big

See also